Zoratu or Zorratu or Zartu or Zuratu, also rendered as Zaztoo, may refer to:
 Zoratu Bala
 Zoratu Pain